The Air Force Falcons men's ice hockey team is a National Collegiate Athletic Association (NCAA) Division I college ice hockey program that represents the United States Air Force Academy. The Falcons are a member of Atlantic Hockey. They play at the Cadet Ice Arena in Colorado Springs, Colorado.

History

Independent
Air Force Academy's Ice hockey program began as a club team in 1966, led by former Michigan head coach and six-time national champion Vic Heyliger. The program grew swiftly and posted a winning record by its third season. In their fourth season, the team posted an impressive 25-6 mark and had the nation's leading scorer on the roster, Dave Skalko. When Heyliger retired in 1974, turning the team over to John Matchefts, the success continued with two more 20+ win seasons in three years. By the time the 1980 rolled around, however, the team's on-ice results began to flag and after a pair of disappointing, single-digit-win seasons Matchefts pushed his team to a .500-record before turning control over to the program's all-time leading scorer. Chuck Delich led the program for the 12 seasons, posting moderate results for most of his tenure, but as the 20th century drew to a close, the Falcons' days as a plucky Independent were numbered.

CHA
In 1997, former Denver head coach Frank Serratore was hired to replace Delich and recorded two 15-win seasons before everything changed for the Falcons. In 1999, Air Force became a founding member of the CHA, joining with the other service academy Army and five other newly-minted Division I teams. Despite the other programs having little history of success, Air Force was unable to make much headway in the conference, with the best finish being 4th out of 7 teams in their inaugural year. Army left the conference after only one year, leaving the conference with only six programs, and the Falcons found themselves as one of the worst. Air Force finished in 5th- or 6th-place for four consecutive seasons and threw in a pair of 4th-place marks for good measure. Despite their regular season woes, the Falcons did achieve some success in the CHA tournament, reaching the semifinals three times despite being an underdog. By 2006, however, it became apparent that the CHA was in trouble. The Falcons left the CHA and were accepted into Atlantic Hockey, rejoining Army in the same conference.

Atlantic Hockey

The change seemed to suit the Falcons, who posted their first winning season in 7 years. In the conference tournament, Air Force defeated Holy Cross 3-0 before stunning #1 seeded Sacred Heart 5-4 in overtime. In the championship match, the Falcons took on Army and routed the Black Knights 6-1 to win the program's first conference championship and receive their first bid into the NCAA tournament. Though they lost to Minnesota in the opening round, the success would continue for the next two years with two additional Atlantic Hockey tournament titles and culminated with a 28-win season in 2009 where they won their first regular season conference title and NCAA tournament game. After a middling season in 2010, the Falcons posted back-to-back conference championships but failed to escape the first round in either season. Air Force spent the mid-teens rebuilding their program, and it came to a head in 2017 with their sixth Atlantic Hockey crown. The Falcons played so well over the course of the season that there was some talk of them making the NCAA tournament even if they were to lose the Atlantic Hockey championship (an exceedingly rare occurrence for Atlantic Hockey Teams). Their second quarterfinal appearance was followed by another in 2018, where they were outplayed by eventual champion Minnesota–Duluth until the final period.

Season-by-season results

All-time coaching records 
As of the end of the 2022–23 season

Awards and honors

U.S. Hockey Hall of Fame
The following individuals have been inducted into the United States Hockey Hall of Fame.

Vic Heyliger (1974)
John Matchefts (1991)

Lowes' Senior CLASS Award

NCAA

 Jacques Lamoureux (2011)
 Kyle Haak (2019)

Derek Hines Unsung Hero Award

NCAA

 Mike Phillipich (2009)
 Dylan Abood (2018)

Scoring Champion

NCAA

 Dave Skalko (1972)

Atlantic Hockey

 Eric Ehn (2007)
 Jacques Lamoureux (2009)
 Tim Kirby (2012)

Player of the year

College Hockey America

 Marc Kielkucki (2001)

Atlantic Hockey

 Eric Ehn (2007)
 Jacques Lamoureux (2009)

Rookie of the year

College Hockey America

 Andy Berg (2000)

Student-Athlete of the year

College Hockey America

 Scott Bradley (2001)
 Brian Gornick (2002)
 Mike Polidor (2004)

Best Defensive Player

Atlantic Hockey

 Brady Tomlak (2020)

Best Defensive Player

College Hockey America

 Blair Bartlett (2006)

Best Defenseman

Atlantic Hockey

 Greeg Flynn (2009)
 Tim Kirby (2012)
 Adam McKenzie (2013)
 Ben Carey (2016)

Individual Sportsmanship Award

Atlantic Hockey

 Jason Fabian (2014)
 Ben Carey(2016)

Regular Season Goaltending Award

Atlantic Hockey

 Shane Starett (2016)
 Billy Christopoulos (2018, 2019)

Coach of the Year

Atlantic Hockey

 Frank Serratore (2016)

Tournament MVP

Atlantic Hockey

 Mike Phillipich (2007)
 Brent Olson (2008)
 Matt Fairchild (2009)
 Jacques Lamoureux (2011)
 Jason Torf (2012)
 Shane Starrett (2017)
 Billy Christopoulos (2018)

NCAA All-Americans
The following Air Force Falcons men's ice hockey players have been chosen as Second Team Division I All-Americans by the American Hockey Coaches Association.

 Eric Ehn (2007)
 Jacques Lamoureux (2009)
 Tim Kirby (2012)

All–CHA Team

First Team
The following Air Force Falcons men's ice hockey players have been chosen as First Team All-CHA.

 Marc Kielkucki (2001)
 Brian Gornick (2001)
 Derek Olson (2002)

Second Team

 Brian Gornick (2000)
 Andy Berg (2001, 2003)
 Brian Gineo (2005)
 Michael Mayra (2006)
 Eric Ehn (2006)

Rookie Team

 Andy Berg (2000)
 Joe Locallo (2001)
 Zach Sikich (2002)
 Matt Charbonneau (2005)
 Eric Ehn (2005)
 Michael Mayra (2006)

All–Atlantic Hockey Team

First Team
The following Air Force Falcons men's ice hockey players have been chosen as First Team All-Atlantic Hockey.

 2006–07: Eric Ehn, F
 2008–09: Andrew Volkening, G; Greg Flynn, D; Jacques Lamoureux, F
 2009–10: Tim Kirby, D; Jacques Lamoureux, F
 2010–11: Scott Mathis, F
 2011–12: Tim Kirby, D; Scott Mathis, F; Kyle De Laurell, F
 2012–13: Adam McKenzie, D; Kyle De Laurell, F
 2015–16: Shane Starrett, G
 2016–17: Phil Boje, D
 2018–19: Billy Christopoulos, G

Second Team

 2006–07: Andrew Ramsey, F
 2007–08: Greg Flynn, D
 2009–10: Andrew Volkening, G
 2010–11: Jacques Lamoureux, F
 2011–12: John Kruse, F
 2013–14: Adam McKenzie, D; Cole Gunner, F
 2014–15: Cole Gunner, F
 2015–16: Johnny Hrabovsky, D
 2016–17: Jordan Himley, F

Third Team

 2007–08: Eric Ehn, F
 2010–11: Tim Kirby, D
 2016–17: Shane Starrett, G
 2019–20: Brandon Koch, D
 2021–22: Brandon Koch, D

Rookie Team

 2008–09: Scott Mathis, D
 2010–11: Jason Torf, G; Adam McKenzie, D
 2013–14: Chris Truehl, G
 2015–16: Shane Starrett, G; Matt Serratore, F
 2019–20: Brandon Koch, D
 2021–22: Mitchell Digby, D; Clayton Cosentino, F

Statistical Leaders

Career Scoring leaders

GP = Games played; G = Goals; A = Assists; Pts = Points; PIM = Penalty minutes

Career Goaltending Leaders

GP = Games played; Min = Minutes played; GA = Goals against; SO = Shutouts; SV% = Save percentage; GAA = Goals against average

Minimum 35 games

Statistics current through the start of the 2017-18 season.

Current roster 
As of August 12, 2022.

Falcons in the NHL
Goalie Shane Starrett signed an Entry Level Contract with the Edmonton Oilers of the NHL on April 10, 2017. He is currently the only Air Force Falcons Men's Ice Hockey player to be in the NHL or respected affiliates.

References

External links 
Air Force Falcons men's ice hockey

 
Ice hockey teams in Colorado